There are currently 304 postal codes in Jamaica, with one and two-digit sector codes only being used in Kingston, the country's capital. 

A plan to introduce a postcode system, was first announced on June 6, 2005. This was to assist the Postal Corporation of Jamaica's international partners in the United States, United Kingdom and Canada to sort letters bound for Jamaica, which ended up in Japan or Jamaica in Long Island in the US.

Despite reports in the [[Jamaica Observer|Sunday Observer]]'' in 2006 that it would be ready introduced by the end of that year, the system was not brought into force because plans to introduce it to Kingston in July 2005 were put on hold due to the fact that the public had difficulty understanding the system. 

On February 12, 2007 it was announced that the postcode project had been suspended indefinitely.

The codes were planned to be alphanumeric, in the format: JMAPPNN, where 
 JM is the ISO 3166-1 alpha-2 country code 
 A is a letter for one of four zones 
 PP are two letters for a parish 
 NN is a two-digit number for a post office

Division of postal codes 
The zones were described in a press release of Jamaica Post 18 July 2005, the encoding of the post offices one week later on 25 July 2005. The four zones into which the parishes are divided does not correspond with the traditional division of parishes into counties. The parish codes are as follows.

Zone A parishes
Kingston: KN
St. Andrew: AW
St. Catherine: CE
Zone B parishes
St. Thomas: TS
Portland: PD
St. Mary: MY
Zone C parishes
Hanover: HR
St. James: JS
Trelawny: TY
St. Ann: AN
Zone D parishes
Clarendon: CN
Manchester: MR
St. Elizabeth: EH
Westmoreland: WD

Relationship to existing postal zones 
Although Kingston, the country's capital, along with part of the parish of St Andrew, was already subdivided into postal zones, these were not incorporated into the new codes. For example, JMAAW03 was to be the postcode for Kingston 8, rather than JMAAW08, which was to be the postcode for Half Way Tree, in Kingston 10, while the postcode for Vineyard Town, Kingston 3 was to have been JMAAW20.

See also 
 ISO 3166-2:JM
 Subdivisions of Jamaica
 Parishes of Jamaica

External links 
 Jamaica Post

References 

Jamaica
Communications in Jamaica